Jeon Sang-hyun (Hangul: 전상현; born January 24, 1984), better known by his stage name Paloalto (Hangul: 팔로알토), is a South Korean rapper and singer. He is the founder of Hi-Lite Records. He has also appeared on Show Me the Money 4, Show Me the Money 777, Show Me the Money 9, and Tribe of Hip Hop.

Discography

Studio albums

Collaborative albums

Extended plays

Singles

Collaborations

Filmography

Television shows

Notes

References

External links

 

1984 births
Living people
South Korean male rappers
South Korean hip hop singers
21st-century South Korean  male singers